Atlantic Terminal and Atlantic Center are two shopping malls located on Atlantic Avenue surrounded by Hanson Place, Fort Greene Place and Flatbush Avenue in the Fort Greene section of Brooklyn, New York City, near Downtown Brooklyn. Atlantic Terminal is located across the street from the Atlantic Center Mall (via a small enclosed bridge from Target), and both are under the same management of Madison International Realty. On December 22, 2017 Atlantic Terminal and Atlantic Center was acquired by Madison International Realty from Forest City Realty Trust. The real estate private equity firm had previously acquired a 49% stake in the Forest City portfolio in 2011 and purchased the remaining 51% in 2017 to make Madison International Realty one of the largest retail landlords in New York. Atlantic Terminal is also an office building and part of the ticket office of the Long Island Rail Road's Atlantic Terminal.  Parts of Atlantic Center Mall were also renovated to complement the new mall. The malls are both located directly across Atlantic Avenue from Barclays Center arena, in the neighborhood of Pacific Park, which is being developed by Forest City Ratner.

In the 1950s, the land was to be the site of a domed baseball stadium proposed by then Brooklyn Dodgers owner Walter O'Malley. However, the plan fell through, and the Dodgers moved to Los Angeles in 1958.

Floors 
Atlantic Terminal has five floors. The lower levels consist of the LIRR and New York City Subway stations (technically in the basement). Upper floors feature anchor stores like Bath & Body Works, Chuck E Cheese, DSW, Sephora, Uniqlo, and most notably Target. The store uses the urban Target layout and has two floors within the mall. It utilizes escalators, elevators and a shopping cart conveyor, design elements that are replicated at other urban locations in New York City and elsewhere. Target, along with the Chuck E Cheese and Buffalo Wild Wings in the mall are described as being the busiest locations for each company in the United States. Two Starbucks locations are sited on the property, one located inside Target while the other is in the ticket office area of the LIRR Atlantic Terminal. 

Atlantic Center has 3 retail levels and 2 underground parking levels, with Stop and Shop and Old Navy on the first floor, Best Buy, Marshalls, and the New York State Department of Motor Vehicles on the second floor in addition to a few smaller retail outlets, and a Burlington Coat Factory and Dave & Busters on the third floor, in addition a music store owned by Afro-Uruguayan vocalist Jimmy Santos is also located in Atlantic Center.

Retail tenants 
Notable stores include:

 Applebee's
 Bath & Body Works
 Best Buy
 Buffalo Wild Wings
 Burlington Coat Factory
 Chuck E. Cheese
 Dave & Busters
 Guitar Center
 MAC Cosmetics
 Marshalls
 McDonald's
 Men's Wearhouse
 Old Navy
 Pandora
 Stop & Shop
 Starbucks
 Target
 Uniqlo
 Verizon Wireless
 Victoria's Secret

See also
 Urban renewal

References

External links  
 Downtown Brooklyn Partnership

Shopping malls in New York City
Shopping malls established in 2004
Forest City Realty Trust
Tourist attractions in Brooklyn
Commercial buildings in Brooklyn
Fort Greene, Brooklyn
2004 establishments in New York City